Spilarctia rubescens is a moth in the family Erebidae. It was described by Francis Walker in 1855. It is found in Myanmar, China (Yunnan) and on Sumatra.

Subspecies
Spilarctia rubescens rubescens
Spilarctia rubescens sanggula Dubatolov, 2010 (western Sumatra)

References

Moths described in 1855
rubescens